Anshar, also spelled Anšar (Sumerian:  , Neo-Assyrian: , meaning "whole heaven"), was a primordial god in the Babylonian creation myth Enuma Elish. His consort is Kishar which means "Whole Earth". They were the children of Lahamu and Lahmu and the grandchildren of Tiamat and Apsû. They, in turn, are the parents of Anu, the god of heaven, lord of constellations, king of gods, spirits and demons.

During the Neo-Assyrian period, Anshar was often equated with Ashur, the patron deity and namesake of the Assyrian Empire.
Anshar might be related to the Amazigh Deity Anzar.

References

External links
Ancient Mesopotamian Gods and Goddesses: Anšar and Kišar (god and goddess)

Mesopotamian gods
Characters in the Enūma Eliš
Sky and weather gods